WRFQ (104.5 MHz, "Q-104.5") is a commercial FM radio station licensed to Mount Pleasant, South Carolina, and serving the Charleston metropolitan area and Lowcountry of South Carolina.  It broadcasts a classic rock radio format and is owned by iHeartMedia, Inc.  The station airs the nationally syndicated Bob and Tom morning show.  The radio studios and offices are on Houston Northcutt Boulevard in Mount Pleasant.

WRFQ has an effective radiated power (ERP) of 100,000 watts, the maximum permitted for non-grandfathered FM stations.  The transmitter is off Venning Road in Mount Pleasant, amid the towers for other Charleston-area TV and FM stations.  WRFQ broadcasts using HD Radio technology.  Its HD-2 digital subchannel carries an iHeartRadio hip hop music service.

Programming
WRFQ plays popular classic rock songs, primarily from the 1970s and 80s, with some titles from the 60s and 90s also in the playlist.  The station carries the nationally syndicated Bob and Tom Morning Show.  The rest of the weekday schedule features shows that are voicetracked from iHeart DJs based at other stations.  Maria Milito (middays) and Ken Dashow (afternoons) do their shows from WAXQ New York City.  Big Rig hosts evenings from WXTB Tampa Bay.

History
On June 1, 1985, the station first signed on the air.  Its call sign was WDXZ and it carried an automated easy listening sound, including news supplied by CBS Radio News.  It later switched to urban contemporary as "Foxy 104.5".

In 1993, it became WJUK, playing country music.

On April 26, 1996, it switched its call letters to WRFQ.  Originally playing Classic Hits music, the station evolved to its current format of "Classic Rock" in 1998.

HD-2
Beginning in January 2009, the station added an HD Radio digital subchannel.  At first, it carried Alternative Rock as "The Drive", a format previously heard on co-owned WALC-FM.   That station was sold in January to the Radio Training Group for a Christian contemporary music format.

The HD-2 subchannel later switched to Hip Hop music, using the iHeartRadio "Hip Hop Workout" channel.

References

External links
Official station website

RFQ
Classic rock radio stations in the United States
Radio stations established in 1985
IHeartMedia radio stations
1985 establishments in South Carolina